Brendan McConville (born 1965) is an author and professor of history at Boston University. His books on American History include The King's Three Faces (University of Carolina Press, 2006) and The American Revolution, 1763-1789 (Longman, 2008).

Career
McConville was educated at Brown University and Reed College, Portland. His research focuses on the intersection of politics and social developments in Early America, and his interests include colonial history and the English Reformation.

Reception
After the release of These Daring Disturbers of the Public Peace, Michael Bellesiles wrote that "Brendan McConville has produced an outstanding work of social history. A few scholars have looked briefly at New Jersey's 1740s land riots, but McConville is the first to place these events in their deep historical context."

In a review of The King's Three Faces for Itinerario, Charles W. A. Prior writes that McConville "brings a great deal of fresh material to light." In Common-place: The Interactive Journal of Early American Life, Benjamin Irvin called the book "a brilliant, bounding study of Anglo-American political culture." The book was also reviewed in The New England Quarterly, The Journal of Military History and The American Historical Review.

Publications

Books
 The American Revolution, 1763-1789 (2008)
 The King's Three Faces (2006)
 These Daring Disturbers of the Public Peace (1999)

References

External links
Boston University webpage

1965 births
Living people
Brown University alumni
Reed College alumni
Boston University faculty
Historians of the American Revolution
21st-century American historians
21st-century American male writers
American male non-fiction writers